Reinhold Mathy (born 12 April 1962) is a German former footballer who played as a forward. He played for Bayern Munich for seven years, winning four German titles and three cups. He retired due to an injury in 1993.

Career

Mathy joined Bayern Munich's youth team in 1979, and made his first-team debut a year later, as a substitute for Norbert Janzon in a 3–1 win over VfL Bochum. He made two more substitute appearances in the 1980–81 season, replacing Dieter Hoeneß and scoring both times, as Bayern ended the season as German champions. The following season he made seventeen appearances without getting on the scoresheet, the last of which was the European Cup Final – he started the match, which Bayern lost 1–0 against Aston Villa, being replaced by Günter Güttler after 51 minutes. Bayern had more luck in the DFB-Pokal, beating 1. FC Nürnberg in the final, which Mathy didn't play in.

By the 1983–84 season Mathy had established himself in Bayern's first team, making 22 league appearances as he won a second Bundesliga title, and a second cup win – he came on as a substitute for Wolfgang Kraus in the final, in which Bayern beat Borussia Mönchengladbach on penalties. 1984–85 was Mathy's prolific season with Bayern – he scored seven goals on the way to another league title, and another cup final, a defeat to Bayer Uerdingen which Mathy missed.

1985–86 brought another league and cup double – this time Mathy started the cup final, a 5–2 win over VfB Stuttgart, and a personal highlight was a hattrick in a 4–2 win over Austria Vienna in the Cup Winners' Cup, helping Bayern on the way to the semi-final. The following season brought early European success for Mathy, too – he scored two goals to settle a European Cup first round win against PSV Eindhoven, and won a third consecutive German title, but missed the entire second half of the season, including the 1987 European Cup Final, which Bayern lost against FC Porto.

Mathy left Bayern in at the end of the 1986–87 season having made exactly 100 Bundesliga appearances for the club, signing for Bayer Uerdingen. He spent three years with the Krefeld club, forming a successful attacking line-up with Stefan Kuntz and Marcel Witeczek, and achieving mostly mid-table finishes. In 1990, he moved to Switzerland to sign for FC Wettingen, where he spent two years, before returning to Germany to sign for Hannover 96. After injuries restricted him to eleven appearances in his first season with Hannover, he retired from football in 1993.

Honours
Bayern Munich
Bundesliga: 1980–81, 1984–85, 1985–86, 1986–87
DFB-Pokal: 1981–82, 1983–84, 1985–86
European Cup: Runner-up 1981–82

References

External links
 

1962 births
Living people
German footballers
Germany under-21 international footballers
Germany youth international footballers
FC Bayern Munich footballers
FC Bayern Munich II players
KFC Uerdingen 05 players
FC Wettingen players
Hannover 96 players
Bundesliga players
2. Bundesliga players
Association football forwards
People from Memmingen
Sportspeople from Swabia (Bavaria)
Footballers from Bavaria
West German footballers